is a railway station on the Tokyo Metro Tozai Line in Edogawa, Tokyo, Japan, operated by the Tokyo subway operator Tokyo Metro. Its station number is T-16.

Lines
Nishi-Kasai Station is served by the Tokyo Metro Tozai Line.

Station layout
The station has two elevated side platforms.

History
Nishi-kasai Station opened on 1 October 1979.

The station facilities were inherited by Tokyo Metro after the privatization of the Teito Rapid Transit Authority (TRTA) in 2004.

References

External links

 Tokyo Metro station information 

Stations of Tokyo Metro
Tokyo Metro Tozai Line
Railway stations in Tokyo
Railway stations in Japan opened in 1979
Edogawa, Tokyo